Andrew Lackfi (1310October 1359) was an influential nobleman and a successful military leader in the Kingdom of Hungary. He was Count of the Székelys between 1343 and 1350, Ban of Macsó from 1355 to 1356, and Voivode of Transylvania between 1356 and 1359.

Early life 

Andrew was a younger son of Lack, or Ladislaus, of the Hermán kindred, who was Count of the Székelys from 1328. Andrew was born around 1310. His brother, Denis, who became a Franciscan friar, was the tutor of the future Louis I of Hungary. Lack's sons and grandsons held important offices after Louis I ascended the throne in 1342.

Early career 

Andrew replaced his father as count of the Székelys and ispán, or head, of the Transylvanian Saxon district of Medgyes (now Mediaș in Romania) in 1343. Next year, he also became the head of the Saxon districts of Beszterce and Brassó (now Bistrița and Brașov in Romania). The office of the head of Beszterce district was attached to the honour of the Counts of the Székelys during his tenure.

To take revenge of the Tatar invasions of Transylvania in the previous years, Louis I dispatched Andrew to lead a military campaign across the territories subjected to the Golden Horde. Andrew and his Székely warriors crossed the Carpathian Mountains and imposed a decisive defeat upon a large Tatar army on 2 February 1345.

References

Sources 

1359 deaths
Bans of Macsó
Counts of the Székelys
Voivodes of Transylvania
Andrew
14th-century Hungarian people